Aglaothamnion is a genus of algae belonging to the family Callithamniaceae.

The genus was first described by Genevieve Feldmann-Mazoyer in 1941, and the type species is Aglaothamnion furcellariae (currently accepted as Aglaothamnion tenuissimum).

The genus has cosmopolitan distribution.

Species

 Aglaothamnion bipinnatum (P.Crouan & H.Crouan) Feldmann & G.Feldmann
 Aglaothamnion boergesenii (Aponte & D.L.Ballantine) L'Hardy-Halos & Rueness  
 Aglaothamnion callophyllidicola (Yamada) Boo, I.K.Lee, Rueness & Yoshida 
 Aglaothamnion caudatum (J.Agardh) Feldmann-Mazoyer 
 Aglaothamnion chadefaudii L'Hardy-Halos
 Aglaothamnion chejuense G.H.Kim & I.K.Lee
 Aglaothamnion collinsii Aponte, D.L.Ballantine & J.N.Norris
 Aglaothamnion cordatum (Børgesen) Feldmann-Mazoyer
 Aglaothamnion diaphanum L'Hardy-Halos & Maggs
 Aglaothamnion endostolon Huisman
 Aglaothamnion endovagum (Setchell & N.L.Gardner) I.A.Abbott
 Aglaothamnion fasciculatum (Harvey) Maggs & L'Hardy-Halos 
 Aglaothamnion feldmanniae Halos
 Aglaothamnion felipponei (Howe) Aponte, Ballantine & J.N.Norris 
 Aglaothamnion flexibile N.E.Aponte & D.L.Ballantine  
 Aglaothamnion gaillonii (P.Crouan & H.Crouan) Halos 
 Aglaothamnion halliae (Collins) Aponte, D.L.Ballantine & J.N.Norris
 Aglaothamnion herveyi (M.Howe) N.E.Aponte, D.L.Ballantine, & J.N.Norris
 Aglaothamnion monopodon Børgesen
 Aglaothamnion obstipum Cowling, Kraft & J.A.West
 Aglaothamnion okiense Kajimura
 Aglaothamnion oosumiense Itono
 Aglaothamnion priceanum Maggs, Guiry & Rueness
 Aglaothamnion pseudobyssoides (P.Crouan & H.Crouan) Halos
 Aglaothamnion rabenhorstii (Kützing) L'Hardy-Halos
 Aglaothamnion roseum (Roth) Maggs & L'Hardy-Halos
 Aglaothamnion sarcodiae Børgesen
 Aglaothamnion tenuissimum (Bonnemaison) Feldmann-Mazoyer 
 Aglaothamnion tripinnatum (C.Agardh) Feldmann-Mazoyer 
 Aglaothamnion uruguayense (W.R.Taylor) N.E.Aponte, D.L.Ballantine & J.N.Norris

References

Ceramiales
Red algae genera